Tanggulashan, or Dangla Town, is a town in the southwest of Qinghai province, China. It forms the southern exclave of the county-level city of Golmud, in Haixi Mongol and Tibetan Autonomous Prefecture, partially administrated by Amdo County, Tibet Autonomous Region since 1963 and still officially a territory of Yushu Prefecture, Qinghai under trust administration of Golmud, Haixi Prefecture, Qinghai. Before the local administrative reform of 2005, it was known as Tanggula Township. It is the only place in China simultaneously under jurisdiction of three prefectures.

Toponymy 
The town's name is Tibetan for "mountain that eagles cannot fly over".

History 
On the eve of the annexation of Tibet by China, a local rebellion broke out in nearby Yushu, causing many members of the Duoma tribe, a tribe of Tibetans, to flee to present-day Tanggulashan.

In the early 1960s, the administrative divisions of Qinghai and Tibet were reorganized, and the area of Tanggulashan was placed under the jurisdiction of the province of Qinghai.

Geography

Tanggula Town is an administrative unit that occupies  in the southwestern corner of Qinghai province. It borders on the Tibet Autonomous Region in the south and west, and on Qinghai's Yushu Tibetan Autonomous Prefecture in the east and north. The western "panhandle" of Yushu Prefecture separates Tanggula Town from the rest of Haixi Prefecture, making it an exclave of Golmud City and of the Haixi Mongol and Tibetan Autonomous Prefecture.

The mountain is notable for its proximity to the source of the Tuotuo River, which itself is one of the sources of the Yangtze River. The area around the peak is protected as part of the Sanjiangyuan National Nature Reserve, which the town is located near. The main settlement is located near the highway and railway crossing of the Tuotuo River, which is one of the headwaters of the Yangtze. This settlement is served by the Togtogquwo railway station. Other settlements in the same highway/railway corridor, further south, are Tongtian Heyan ("Tongtian Riverside"), Yanshiping,  Wenquan, and Tanggula Bingzhan ("Tanggula Military Post").

Most of the town's area is mountainous, and open grasslands cover much of the town's remaining area. Grazing is prohibited or highly regulated on much of Tanggulashan's grasslands.

Tanggula Town is administratively divided into 8 village-level units (seven nomads' committee and one villagers' committee). The region is sparsely populated, with the registered population of 1,286 (year 2006) and the present population estimated at about 1,900. Most of these people live in several small villages located along the Golmud-Lhasa highway and railway corridor (China National Highway 109 and Qinghai-Tibet Railway).

At Tanggula Pass on the southern border of the province, the railway leaves Qinghai for Tibet, and therefore the Tanggula railway station, which is located a short distance south of the pass, is actually outside of Tanggula Town, and is already within the Tibet Autonomous Region.

Climate 
Tanggulashan has a tundra climate (ET) with long, frigid, very dry winters and short, cool, less dry summers.

Demographics 
As of 2020, Tanggulashan is home to a population of 1,750, who reside in 581 different households.

Tibetans who live in Tanggulashan largely hail from the Duoma tribe, one of the eight Tibetan tribes in the Amdo region.

According to a 2021 publication by the Golmud city government, 247 people in Tanggulashan are members of the Chinese Communist Party.

Economy
The traditional occupation of the local residents is the raising and breeding of livestock. Specific breeds of sheep and yak, such as the Tanggula yak and the Tibetan sheep, have received geographical indication from the Ministry of Agriculture of China. As of 2020, the average annual income for a herder in Tanggulashan totaled 29,020 renminbi (RMB). According to the local authorities in Golmud, overgrazing is a concern in the area, as it is throughout the southwestern Qinghai. As a result, grazing is restricted and limited in certain areas, and projects are underway to reduce the livestock population in Tanggulashan to what is thought to be the "scientifically sound" target of 53,600.

Besides overgrazing by livestock, the local pasture land also suffers depredation by rats. After some attempts to poison them (with obvious side effects), in 2009 the local authorities started a campaign to attract birds of prey to the area, hoping that they would help to keep the rat population under control. For this purpose, 830 bird perches were erected in the affected areas.

In 2007, it was reported that a factory producing traditional Tibetan carpets opened in the area, employing about 80 people.

Transportation 
The town is connected to the Qinghai-Tibet railway, and the Tanggula railway station serves as the last stop before entering Tibet.

References

Populated places in Qinghai
Township-level divisions of Qinghai
Haixi Mongol and Tibetan Autonomous Prefecture